Birchanger is a village in Essex, England,  northeast of Bishop's Stortford and  northwest of the county town, Chelmsford.  The village is in the district of Uttlesford and the parliamentary constituency of Saffron Walden. There is a Parish Council.

The local CoE church of St Mary the Virgin, dating from the 12th century, is a Grade II* listed building.

It is also the site of Birchanger Green services on the M11 motorway.

At the 2011 census, it had a population of 1,589.

In the 12th Century, the village name in Old English was "Bircehangra", which means "wooded slope growing with birch trees". This name is still appropriate today as parts of Birchanger Wood still exist and contain many birch trees.

See also
Birchanger Green services
The Hundred Parishes

References

External links

Villages in Essex
Uttlesford